Bronson James is an American lawyer and jurist serving as a justice of the Oregon Supreme Court. He assumed office on January 1, 2023.

Education 
James earned a Bachelor of Arts degree from Reed College in 1994 and a Juris Doctor and a Juris Doctor from the Lewis & Clark Law School in 2003.

Career 
James was nominated to the Oregon Court of Appeals in 2017. He previously served as a public defender in the Oregon Office of Public Defense Services. In 2014, James authored an amicus brief on behalf of National Association of Criminal Defense Lawyers in Riley v. California. In December 2022, James was appointed to the Oregon Supreme Court by outgoing governor Kate Brown.

References 

Living people
Oregon lawyers
Reed College alumni
Lewis & Clark Law School alumni
Lewis & Clark College alumni
Justices of the Oregon Supreme Court
Year of birth missing (living people)